Opera Coast is a discontinued web browser developed for iOS devices by Opera Software. The browser was not based on any former product of Opera and was written from scratch. It was also designed for touch while traditional browser buttons and components such as tabs, history, and bookmarks are eliminated and replaced by gestures.

History
Opera Coast was first released on September 9, 2013. An iPhone version followed in April 2014. 

In February 2016, Opera announced an Android version of the browser, which was ultimately never released.

Coast was discontinued and removed from the Apple App Store in August 2017.

Security
An embedded security mechanism was implemented in Opera Coast which included several security aspects, like certificates, site reputation, URLs, browsing history, and page content, and the user would be warned if any risk is detected.

Synchronization
Opera Coast was designed to automatically perform synchronization using iCloud. This synchronization kept the tiles on the home screen the same.

Localization
Coast was available in 32 languages.

References

External links

 

Freeware
Opera Software
iOS web browsers